
Limanowa County is a unit of territorial administration and local government (powiat) in Lesser Poland Voivodeship, southern Poland. It came into being on January 1, 1999, as a result of the Polish local government reforms passed in 1998.

As of 2019 its total population is 121,804, out of which the population of Limanowa is 15,157, that of Mszana Dolna is 7,944, and the rural population is 108,628.

Neighbouring counties
Limanowa County is bordered by Bochnia County and Brzesko County to the north, Nowy Sącz County to the east, Nowy Targ County to the south-west, and Myślenice County to the west.

Administrative division
The county is subdivided into 12 gminas (two urban and 10 rural). These are listed in the following table, in descending order of population.

References

 
Populated places established in 1999
Limanowa
1999 establishments in Poland